Yu-ri Kim (August 29, 1989 – April 18, 2011) was a South Korean fashion model, who was active from late 2000s to early 2010s. Despite being considered one of the most promising models in the runway scene in South Korea, she died by suicide at the peak of her career.

Biography
Kim was born in Seoul, South Korea on August 29, 1989. She began professional modeling in 2007 when she participated in a modeling contest. During her short career she modeled mainly in the runway scene, walking for numerous fashion brands. She also had an endorsement deal with a car brand in 2009.

Her mother died of a heart attack in 2009, and her father died of cancer in early 2011. After that, her grandmother was her only remaining family member.

Death
On April 18, 2011, she was found dead at age 21 in her apartment in Samseong-dong, Seoul.

Prior to her death she had posted multiple articles about her struggles with being able to be "super skinny" on her blog, which were noted after her death. It is suspected that she died by suicide using poison. However, the autopsy couldn't confirm the cause of death.

See also
Suicide in South Korea

References

South Korean female models
People from Seoul
Suicides by poison in South Korea
1989 births
2011 deaths
2011 suicides
Female suicides